Vijay Kumar (born 12 April 1962) is an Indian roboticist and UPS foundation professor in the School of Engineering & Applied Science with secondary appointments in computer and information science and electrical and systems engineering at the University of Pennsylvania, and became the new Dean of Penn Engineering on 1 July 2015.

Kumar is known for his research in the control and coordination of multi-robot formations.
He was elected to the American Philosophical Society in 2018.

Education
 B.Tech., Mechanical Engineering, Indian Institute of Technology, Kanpur, India, May 1983
 M.Sc., Mechanical Engineering, Ohio State University, Columbus, Ohio, March 1988
 Ph.D., Mechanical Engineering, Ohio State University, Columbus, Ohio, September 1987

About his research work

Honours and awards
 The Ohio State University Presidential Fellowship (1986)
 NSF Presidential Young Investigator Award (1991)
 Lindback Award for Distinguished Teaching, University of Pennsylvania (1996)
 The Ferdinand Freudenstein Award for significant contributions to mechanisms and robotics awarded at the 5th National Conference on Mechanisms and Robotics (1997)
 Best paper award, Distributed Autonomous Robotic Systems (2002)
 Fellow, American Society of Mechanical Engineers (2003)
 Kayamori Best Paper Award, IEEE International Conference on Robotics and Automation (2004)
 IEEE Robotics and Automation Society Distinguished Lecturer (2005)
 Fellow, Institute for Electrical and Electronics Engineers (2005)
 IEEE Robotics and Automation Society Distinguished Award (2012)
 George H. Heilmeier Faculty Award for Excellence in Research (2013)
 Member, National Academy of Engineering (2013)
 Popular Mechanics Breakthrough Award (2013)
 IIT Kanpur Distinguished Alumnus Award 2013–14, for his outstanding contributions to the area of control and coordination of multi-robot formations.
 The Joseph Engelberger Award by the Robotics Industries Association (2014)
 IEEE Robotics and Automation Award (2020)

References

External links
 Vijay Kumar Lab at UPenn
 
 "Robots that fly ... and cooperate" (TED2012)

1962 births
Living people
Control theorists
Indian roboticists
University of Pennsylvania faculty
IIT Kanpur alumni
Ohio State University College of Engineering alumni
American academics of Indian descent
Members of the American Philosophical Society